is a passenger railway station located in the city of Machida, Tokyo, Japan, operated by the private railway operator Tokyu Corporation.

Lines

Before, express trains did not stop on weekdays; however, starting from October 2019, the station changed name to "Minami-machida Grandberry Park" and express trains now stop at this station every day.

Station layout
The station is above-ground and has two opposed side platforms serving two tracks, connected by footbridges. The south exit leads to the Grandberry Park.

Platforms

History
Minami-Machida Station opened on 15 October 1976.

Passenger statistics
In fiscal 2019, the station was used by an average of 40,084 passengers daily.

The passenger figures for previous years are as shown below.

Surrounding area
 Grandberry Park shopping mall (formerly "Grandberry Mall shopping mall")
 Tokyo Jogakkan College
 Naval Support Facility Kamiseya

References

External links

 Minami-machida Grandberry Park Station information (Tokyu) 

Railway stations in Japan opened in 1976
Tokyu Den-en-toshi Line
Stations of Tokyu Corporation
Railway stations in Tokyo
Machida, Tokyo